The NOGI Awards is an award presented annually by the Academy of Underwater Arts and Sciences (AUAS) to diving luminaries and is "considered the Oscar of the ocean world." Selection of recipients is based on their record of accomplishments and excellence in the diving world. NOGI awards are given out to world-class standouts of the diving community who have distinguished themselves and made a global impact on diving in one or more of four general categories: Science, Arts, Sports/Education, and Environment. A fifth NOGI is given for Distinguished Service.

History
The NOGI awards originally came in existence as part of the trophy system offered during the 1950s for the underwater division of the New Orleans Grand Isle Fishing Tournament.  NOGI is the acronym for the first four words of the tournament's name.  In its current form, the NOGI awards date back to 1960 when Jay Albeanese and Louis Cuccia of New Orleans approached the Underwater Society of America for its sanction of an "award to annually recognize leaders in the field of skin and SCUBA diving in four categories."  Since 1993, the NOGI awards scheme has been the responsibility of the Academy of Underwater Arts and Sciences. In 2013, a fifth category "Environment" was added to the awards scheme.

Academy of Underwater Arts and Sciences
The Academy of Underwater Arts and Sciences (AUAS) was formed in 1993 for the purpose of administering the NOGI Awards.  It has status as a 501(c)3 non-profit organization.  Its mission is to be:
a 501(c)3 non-profit, international, multi-disciplinary organization dedicated to recognizing pioneers and leaders who have had a significant impact on the exploration, enjoyment, safety, and preservation of the underwater world. The AUAS is committed to supporting its members as they pass on the stewardship of the sea to future generations.

NOGI categories
There are five categories of NOGIs.

Science: Recipients in the Science category include renowned underwater archaeologists such as E. Lee Spence and George Bass, inventors like Edwin Link, undersea explorers like Sylvia Earle and Robert Ballard, doctors involved in hyperbaric medicine such as Joseph MacInnis, as well as marine biologists, and other marine scientists.

Arts: Awardees in the Arts category have included internationally known filmmakers such as James Cameron and Stan Waterman, marine artists like Guy Harvey, and photographers such as National Geographic's Emory Kristof.

Sports/education: The Sports & Education category recognizes distinguished diver athletes like Ron Taylor and Bret Gilliam (diver), educators like John Christopher Fine and even actors like Lloyd Bridges and Zale Parry who were pioneer scuba divers and portrayed divers on TV's Sea Hunt, and thus helped to encourage and grow the public's interest in diving.

Environment: The newest category of NOGI which was added in 2013 is for Environment and its first recipient is Dr. G. Carleton Ray. It is meant to recognize divers who, well beyond their normal employment, have led efforts to protect the world's underwater heritage.

Distinguished service: Distinguished Service recipients have typically included world-renowned divers like Captain Jacques-Yves Cousteau and Astronaut/Aquanaut Scott Carpenter but they have also included lesser known people whose professional, volunteer and/or private work has truly had a major impact on the diving industry and/or the global diving community in general.

The statuette
The original NOGI statuettes were designed by New Orleans sculptor Vero Puccio, who hand carved them out of mahogany (one report says balsa) and later cast them out of polywood. Since 2005, when the statuette, which shows a pedestal mounted skin diver standing with upraised arms holding a plaque reading "NOGI," was updated by marine wildlife artist Wyland (who is also a NOGI winner), the statuettes have been made of cast lucite.

NOGI Award recipients 
The following is a listing of all NOGI recipients since its creation in 1960.

References

External links
Academy of Underwater Arts and Sciences

Underwater diving awards
American awards